Zdeněk Kudrna (born 2 September 1946 in Čisovice, Czechoslovakia - died 1 June 1982) was an international  speedway rider who reached he Speedway World Championship final in 1979. He also finished third in the Individual Ice Racing World Championship twice, in 1977 and 1979. Kudrna was Czech Ice Racing champion six times, after the last of which he was awarded title Sportsman of the Year by the Czech Motorcycle Federation.

Kudrna first rode in the UK for the Exeter Falcons in 1979 with compatriots Aleš Dryml Sr., Jan Verner and Václav Verner. Also in 1979 he finished seventh Speedway World Championship final and was a member of the Czechoslovak team that finished third in the Speedway World Team Cup.

1980 saw him move to the Birmingham Brummies where he was nicknamed Kermit due to his bright green leathers. The Czechoslovak authorities refused him permission to ride in the UK in 1981 but in 1982 he returned to the Brummies.

World Final Appearances

Individual World Championship
 1978 -  London, Wembley Stadium - Reserve - did not ride
 1979 -  Chorzów, Silesian Stadium - 7th - 8pts

World Team Cup
 1979 -  London, White City Stadium (with Jiří Štancl / Aleš Dryml Sr. / Václav Verner) - 3rd - 19pts (4)
 1980 -  Wrocław, Olympic Stadium (with Jiří Štancl / Aleš Dryml Sr. / Václav Verner / Petr Ondrašík) - 4th - 12pt (1)

World Longtrack Championship
 1976 –  Marianske Lazne 6th 14pts
 1977 –  Aalborg 12th 8pts
 1978 –  Mühldorf 15th 7pts 
 1979 –  Marianske Lazne 16th 2pts
 1980 –  Scheeßel 8th 9pts
 1981 –  Gornja Radgona 14th 4pts

Individual Ice Speedway World Championship
1974 –  Nässjö 13th 4pts
1975 –  Moscow 9th 12pts
1976 –  Assen 7th 18pts
1977 –  Inzell 3rd 24pts
1978 –  Assen 11th 10pts
1979 –  Inzell 3rd 26pts
1980 –  Kalinin 4th 22pts
1981 -  Assen 4th 25pts
1982 -  Inzell 4th

Death
On 31 May 1982 Kudrna was racing in a grasstrack meeting in Stadskanaal, the Netherlands. He had already qualified to go through to the next round when midway through the final race, his throttle stuck open and he crashed full speed into the barrier. A wooden stake holding the fence impaled him. Despite being rushed to hospital, Kudrna died the next day from his injuries.

References

See also 
 Czech Republic national speedway team
 Individual Ice Racing World Championship

1946 births
1982 deaths
Czechoslovak speedway riders
Exeter Falcons riders
Birmingham Brummies riders
Motorcycle racers who died while racing